Nightshades: Thirteen Journeys Into Shadow is a dark fantasy/horror short story compilation by British author Tanith Lee. It contains a long novella, which was the only previously unpublished story included, and 12 short stories. Each story in this book is preceded by a brief introductory note by the author.

Contents

Nightshades: Thirteen Journeys Into Shadow contains the following tales:

The novella
Nightshade

Short stories

The Mermaid
After The Guillotine
Meow
Il Bacio (Il Chiave)
A Room With A Vie
Paper Boat
Blue Vase Of Ghosts
Pinewood
The Janfia Tree
The Devil's Rose
Huzdra
Three Days

1993 short story collections
Fantasy short story collections
Horror short story collections
Short story collections by Tanith Lee